ASIJ may refer to:

American School in Japan
Academic Society of Iranians in Japan